The 46th Annual Grammy Awards were held on February 8, 2004, at the Staples Center in Los Angeles, California honoring the best in music for the recording of the year beginning from October 1, 2002, through September 30, 2003. They recognized accomplishments by musicians from the previous year. The big winners were Beyoncé, who won five awards, and Outkast, who won three awards including Album of the Year. Tied for the most nominations, with six each, were Beyoncé, Outkast, and Jay-Z.

Performances
 Opening: Prince and Beyoncé – "Purple Rain/Baby I'm a Star/Let's Go Crazy/Crazy in Love"
 The Beatles 40 Years Ago: Sting, Dave Matthews, Pharrell and Vince Gill – "I Saw Her Standing There"
 Justin Timberlake and Arturo Sandoval – "Señorita"
 The Black Eyed Peas and Justin Timberlake – "Where Is the Love?"
 Foo Fighters and Chick Corea – "Times Like These"
 The White Stripes – "Seven Nation Army"
 Warren Zevon Tribute. "Keep Me In Your Heart" Performers: Emmylou Harris, Billy Bob Thornton, Dwight Yoakam, Jackson Browne, Jorge Calderon, Timothy B. Schmit
 Beyoncé – Dangerously in Love 2
 Funk Music Tribute: OutKast, Earth, Wind & Fire, Robert Randolph and the Family Band, George Clinton with Parliament-Funkadelic and "Minister" Samuel L. Jackson
 Christina Aguilera – Beautiful
 Sarah McLachlan with Alison Krauss - Fallen 
 Martina McBride – Concrete Angel
 Sting & Sean Paul - Roxanne
 Alicia Keys - A House Is Not a Home
 Celine Dion & Richard Marx – Dance with My Father
 OutKast - Hey Ya!

Presenters
 Gwen Stefani & Quentin Tarantino - Best Contemporary R&B Album
 John Mayer & Matthew Perry - Best Pop Performance by a Duo or Group with Vocals
 Joshua Bell & Keith Urban - Best Female Country Vocal Performance
 B.B. King & Aerosmith - Best Rap Album
 Patti LaBelle - Introducing Alicia Keys, Celine Dion & Richard Marx: A Tribute to Luther Vandross
 Madonna - Introducing Sting & Sean Paul
 Ellen DeGeneres
 Sean Astin & Norah Jones - Best New Artist
 Paulina Rubio, Hilary Duff & Brian McKnight - Best Female Pop Vocal Performance
 Amy Lee, Amber Tamblyn & Jakob Dylan - Best Male Pop Vocal Performance
 Sharon Osbourne & Ozzy Osbourne - Best Rock Performance by a Duo or Group with Vocals
 Babyface, Carole King & Kurt Elling - Song of the Year
 Michael McDonald & Mary J. Blige - Record of the Year
 Carlos Santana & Faith Hill - Album of the Year

Effects of the Super Bowl XXXVIII controversy 
Janet Jackson was originally scheduled to perform a tribute to Luther Vandross during the ceremony. However, due to an incident involving Jackson during the Super Bowl XXXVIII halftime show the previous week, where her breast was briefly revealed by Justin Timberlake, Jackson was blacklisted by CBS's parent company Viacom and her invitation to the ceremony was rescinded. Despite his involvement in the "wardrobe malfunction", Timberlake was still invited, and used one of his acceptance speeches to apologize for the incident. CBS also broadcast the ceremony on a five-minute tape delay.

Winners and nominees
Bold type indicates the winner out of the list of nominees.

Reference for the nominations:

General
Record of the Year
 "Clocks" – Coldplay
 Coldplay & Ken Nelson, producers; Coldplay, Ken Nelson & Mark Phythian, engineers/mixers
 "Crazy In Love" – Beyoncé featuring Jay-Z
 Rich Harrison & Beyoncé Knowles, producers; Jim Caruana & Tony Maserati, engineers/mixers
 "Where Is the Love?" – The Black Eyed Peas & Justin Timberlake
 Ron Fair & will.i.am, producers; Dylan Dresdow & Tony Maserati, engineers/mixers
 "Lose Yourself" – Eminem
 Eminem, producer; Eminem, Steve King & Micheal Strange, Jr., engineers/mixers
 "Hey Ya! – OutKast
 André 3000, producer; Kevin "KD" Davis, John Frye, Robert Hannon, Pete Novak & Neal Pogue, engineers/mixers

Album of the Year
 Speakerboxxx/The Love Below – OutKast
 André "3000" Benjamin, Antwon "Big Boi" Patton & Carl Mo, producers; Vincent Alexander, Chris Carmouche, Kevin "KD" Davis, Reggie Dozier, John Frye, Robert Hannon, Padraic Kernin, Moka Nagatani, Pete Novak, Brian Paturalski, Neal Pogue, Dexter Simmons, Matt Still & Darrell Thorpe, engineers/mixers; Brian Gardner & Bernie Grundman, mastering engineers
 Under Construction – Missy Elliott
 Craig Brockman, Missy "Misdemeanor" Elliott, Erroll "Poppi" McCalla, Nisan & Timbaland, producers; Jeff Allen, Carlos "El Loco" Bedoya, Josh Butler, Senator Jimmy D, Guru, Timbaland & Mike Wilson, engineers/mixers; Herb Powers, mastering engineer
 Fallen – Evanescence
 Dave Fortman & Ben Moody, producers; Jay Baumgardner, Dave Fortman & Jeremy Parker, engineers/mixers; Ted Jensen, mastering engineer
 Justified – Justin Timberlake
 Brian McKnight, The Neptunes, Scott Storch, Timbaland & The Underdogs, producers; Andrew Coleman, Jimmy Douglass, Serban Ghenea, Dabling Harward, Steve Penny, Dave "Hard Drive" Pensado, Dave "Natural Love" Russell, Timbaland & Chris Wood, engineers/mixers; Herb Powers Jr., mastering engineer
 Elephant – The White Stripes
 Jack White, producer; Liam Watson & Jack White, engineers/mixers; Noel Summerville, mastering engineer

Song of the Year
 "Dance With My Father"
 Richard Marx & Luther Vandross, songwriters (Luther Vandross)
 "Beautiful" 
 Linda Perry, songwriter (Christina Aguilera)
 "I'm With You" 
 Avril Lavigne & The Matrix, songwriters (Avril Lavigne)
 "Keep Me In Your Heart" 
 Jorge Calderón & Warren Zevon, songwriters (Warren Zevon)
 "Lose Yourself"
 J. Bass, M. Mathers & L. Resto, songwriters (Eminem)

Best New Artist
 Evanescence
 50 Cent
 Fountains of Wayne
 Heather Headley
 Sean Paul

Alternative
Best Alternative Music Album
 Elephant – The White Stripes
 Fight Test – The Flaming Lips
 Hail to the Thief – Radiohead
 Untitled – Sigur Rós
 Fever to Tell – Yeah Yeah Yeahs

Blues
Best Traditional Blues Album
Jacquire King (engineer), Ed Cherney (engineer/mixer), Dennis Herring (producer) & Buddy Guy for Blues Singer
Best Contemporary Blues Album
Donto James (engineer/producer), Josh Sklair (producer), Sametto James (producer) & Etta James for Let's Roll

Children's
Best Musical Album for Children
Cathy Fink & Marcy Marxer for Bon Appétit!
Best Spoken Word Album for Children
Bill Clinton, Mikhail Gorbachev & Sophia Loren for Wolf Tracks and Peter and the Wolf, music performed by the Russian National Orchestra conducted by Kent Nagano

Classical
Best Orchestral Performance
Pierre Boulez (conductor) & the Vienna Philharmonic for Mahler: Symphony No. 3 performed by Anne Sofie von Otter, Johannes Prinz, Gerald Wirth, the Vienna Boys' Choir & the Women's Chorus of the Vienna Singverein
Best Classical Vocal Performance
Thomas Quasthoff & Anne Sofie von Otter for Schubert: Lieder with Orchestra performed by Thomas Quasthoff, Anne Sofie von Otter & the Chamber Orchestra of Europe conducted by Claudio Abbado
Best Opera Recording
Wolfram Graul (producer), Bernard Haitink (conductor), Jerry Hadley, Karita Mattila, Eva Randová, Anja Silja, Jorma Silvasti for Janáček's: Jenůfa performed by the Orchestra of the Royal Opera House & Chorus & various artists
Best Choral Performance
Paavo Järvi (conductor), Tiia-Ester Loitme & Ants Soots (chorus masters) for Sibelius: Cantatas performed by the Ellerhein Girls' Choir, the Estonian National Male Choir & the Estonian National Symphony Orchestra
Best Instrumental Soloist(s) Performance (with orchestra)
Mstislav Rostropovich (conductor) & Maxim Vengerov for Britten: Violin Concerto/Walton: Viola Concerto performed by Maxim Vengerov & the London Symphony Orchestra
Best Instrumental Soloist Performance (without orchestra)
Emanuel Ax for Haydn: Piano Sonatas Nos. 29, 31, 34, 35 & 49
Best Small Ensemble Performance (with or without conductor)
Jeff von der Schmidt (conductor) & Southwest Chamber Music for "Chávez: Suite for Double Quartet"
Best Chamber Music Performance
The Kronos Quartet & Dawn Upshaw for Berg: Lyric Suite
Best Classical Contemporary Composition
Dominick Argento (composer) for "Argento: Casa Guidi" performed by Frederica von Stade, Eiji Oue & the Minnesota Orchestra
Best Classical Album
Andreas Neubronner (producer), Michael Tilson Thomas (conductor) & Michelle DeYoung for Mahler: Symphony No. 3; Kindertotenlieder performed by Michelle DeYoung, Vance George, the Pacific Boychoir, the San Francisco Girls Chorus & the San Francisco Symphony & Chorus
Best Classical Crossover Album
Jorge Calandrelli (conductor) & Yo-Yo Ma for Obrigado Brazil performed by various artists

Comedy
Best Comedy Album
"Weird Al" Yankovic for Poodle Hat

Composing and arranging
Best Instrumental Composition
Wayne Shorter (composer) for "Sacajawea"
Best Instrumental Arrangement
Michael Brecker & Gil Goldstein (arrangers) for "Timbuktu" performed by the Michael Brecker Quindectet
Best Instrumental Arrangement Accompanying Vocalist(s)
Vince Mendoza (arranger) for "Woodstock" (Joni Mitchell)

Country
Best Female Country Vocal Performance
June Carter Cash for "Keep on the Sunny Side"
Best Male Country Vocal Performance
Vince Gill for "Next Big Thing"
Best Country Performance by a Duo or Group with Vocal
Ricky Skaggs & Kentucky Thunder for "A Simple Life"
Best Country Collaboration with Vocals
James Taylor & Alison Krauss for "How's the World Treating You"
Best Country Instrumental Performance
Alison Krauss & Union Station for "Cluck Old Hen"
Best Country Song
Jim Moose Brown & Don Rollins (songwriters) for "It's Five O'Clock Somewhere" performed by Alan Jackson & Jimmy Buffett
Best Country Album
Carl Jackson (producer) for Livin', Lovin', Losin' – Songs of the Louvin Brothers performed by various artists
Best Bluegrass Album
Alison Krauss & Union Station for Live

Dance
Best Dance Recording
Rob Davis, Cathy Dennis (producers), Rob Davis, Cathy Dennis, Bruce Elliott-Smith, Phil Larsen (mixers) & Kylie Minogue for "Come Into My World"

Film/TV/media
Best Compilation Soundtrack Album for a Motion Picture, Television or Other Visual Media
Randy Spendlove & Ric Wake (compilation producers) & Various Artists for Chicago: Music from the Miramax Motion Picture

Best Score Soundtrack Album for a Motion Picture, Television or Other Visual Media
John J. Kurlander (engineer), Peter Cobbin (engineer/mixer) & Howard Shore (composer) for The Lord of the Rings: The Two Towers: Original Motion Picture Soundtrack

Best Song Written for a Motion Picture, Television or Other Visual Media
Christopher Guest, Eugene Levy & Michael McKean (songwriters) for A Mighty Wind performed by The Folksmen, Mitch & Mickey & The New Main Street Singers

Folk
Best Traditional Folk Album
Wildwood Flower – June Carter Cash
Best Contemporary Folk Album
The Wind – Warren Zevon
Best Native American Music Album
Flying Free – Black Eagle

Gospel
Best Pop/Contemporary Gospel Album
Michael W. Smith for Worship Again

Best Rock Gospel Album
Audio Adrenaline for Worldwide

Best Traditional Soul Gospel Album
The Blind Boys of Alabama for Go Tell It on the Mountain

Best Contemporary Soul Gospel Album
Donnie McClurkin for ...Again

Best Southern, Country or Bluegrass Gospel Album
Rise and Shine – Randy Travis

Best Gospel Choir or Chorus Album
Bishop T.D. Jakes (choir director) & the Potter's House Mass Choir for A Wing and a Prayer

Historical
Best Historical Album
Steve Berkowitz, Alex Gibney, Andy McKaie, Jerry Rappaport (producers), Gavin Lurssen & Joseph M. Palmaccio (engineers) for Martin Scorsese Presents the Blues: A Musical Journey performed by various artists

Jazz
Best Jazz Instrumental Solo
"Matrix" – Chick Corea in Rendezvous in New York

Best Jazz Instrumental Album, Individual or Group
Clark Germain (engineer), Dave Darlington (engineer/mixer), Robert Sadin (engineer/mixer & producer) & Wayne Shorter for Alegría

Best Large Jazz Ensemble Album
Jay Newland (engineer/mixer), Gil Goldstein, Michael Brecker (producers) & the Michael Brecker Quindectet for Wide Angles

Best Jazz Vocal Album
Michael O'Reilly (engineer), Arif Mardin (producer) & Dianne Reeves for A Little Moonlight

Best Contemporary Jazz Album
George Whitty (engineer/mixer & producer) & Randy Brecker (producers & artist) for 34th N Lex

Best Latin Jazz Album
Robert J. Friedrich (engineer/mixer), Michel Camilo (producer & artist), Charles Flores & Horacio "El Negro" Hernandez for Live at the Blue Note

Latin
Best Latin Pop Album
Mick Guzauski (engineer/mixer), Lulo Perez (producer) & Alejandro Sanz (producer & artist) for No Es Lo Mismo
Best Traditional Tropical Latin Album
Jerry Boys (engineer/mixer), Ry Cooder (producer) & Ibrahim Ferrer for Buenos Hermanos
Best Mexican/Mexican-American Album
Jose Angel Cabrera & Dennis Parker (engineers), Daniel Estevez T. (engineer/mixer) & Joan Sebastian (producer & artist) for Afortunado
Best Latin Rock/Alternative Album
Anibal Kerpel, Joseph Chiccarelli (engineers), Elfego Buendia, Emmanuel Del Real, Gustavo Santaolalla, Jose "Joselo" Rangel, Quique Rangel (producers) & Café Tacuba for Cuatro Caminos
Best Tejano Album
Edward Perez, Ramiro Serna (engineers), Jimmy Gonzalez producer & Jimmy Gonzalez y El Grupo Mazz for Si Me Faltas Tu
Best Salsa/Merengue Album
Jon Fausty, Luca Germini, Jorge G. Gómez, Carlos Laurenz, Jose Lopez, Olga Santos, Jake Tanner, (engineers), Jorge G. Garcia (engineer/mixer), Oscar Gómez (engineer/mixer & producer), Sergio George (producer) & Celia Cruz for Regalo Del Alma

Musical show
Best Musical Show Album
Todd Whitelock, Tom Lazarus (engineers), Ken Hahn (engineer/mixer) & Jay David Saks (engineer/mixer & producer) for Gypsy performed by the New Broadway cast with Bernadette Peters, Tammy Blanchard, John Dossett & others

Music video
Best Short Form Music Video
Aris McGarry (video producer), Mark Romanek (video director) & Johnny Cash for "Hurt"
Best Long Form Music Video
Michael Gochanour, Robin Klein & Mary Wharton (video producers) for "Legend" performed by Sam Cooke

New Age
Best New Age Album
One Quiet Night – Pat Metheny
Inner Journeys: Myths & Legends – Cusco
Solace – Michael Hoppé
Red Moon – Peter Kater
Sacred Journey of Ku-Kai – Kitarō

Packaging and notes
Best Recording Package
Ani DiFranco & Brian Grunert (art directors) for Evolve performed by Ani DiFranco

Best Boxed or Special Limited Edition Package
Julian Alexander, Howard Fritzson & Seth Rothstein (art directors) for The Complete Jack Johnson Sessions performed by Miles Davis

Best Album Notes
Tom Piazza (notes writer) for Martin Scorsese Presents the Blues: A Musical Journey performed by Various Artists

Polka
Best Polka Album
Let's Polka 'Round – Jimmy Sturr

Pop
Best Female Pop Vocal Performance
"Beautiful" – Christina Aguilera
"Miss Independent" – Kelly Clarkson
"White Flag" – Dido
"I'm with You" – Avril Lavigne
"Fallen" – Sarah McLachlan

Best Male Pop Vocal Performance
"Cry Me a River" – Justin Timberlake
"Any Road" – George Harrison
"Ain't No Mountain High Enough" – Michael McDonald
"Send Your Love" – Sting
"Keep Me in Your Heart" – Warren Zevon

Best Pop Performance by a Duo or Group with Vocal
"Underneath It All" – No Doubt
"Misunderstood" – Bon Jovi
"Hole in the World" – The Eagles
"Stacy's Mom" – Fountains of Wayne
"Unwell" – Matchbox 20

Best Pop Collaboration with Vocals
"Whenever I Say Your Name" – Sting & Mary J. Blige
"Can't Hold Us Down" – Christina Aguilera & Lil' Kim
"La Vie En Rose" – Tony Bennett & k.d. lang
"Gonna Change My Way Of Thinking" – Bob Dylan & Mavis Staples
"Feel Good Time" – Pink & William Orbit

Best Pop Instrumental Performance
"Marwa Blues" – George Harrison
"Patricia" – Ry Cooder & Manuel Galbán
"Honey-Dipped" – Dave Koz
"Seabiscuit" – Randy Newman
"The Nutcracker Suite" – The Brian Setzer Orchestra

Best Pop Vocal Album
Justified – Justin Timberlake
Stripped – Christina Aguilera
Brainwashed – George Harrison
Bare – Annie Lennox
Motown – Michael McDonald

Best Pop Instrumental Album
Mambo Sinuendo – Ry Cooder & Manuel Galbán

Production and engineering
Best Engineered Album, Non-Classical
Nigel Godrich & Darrell Thorp (engineers) for Hail to the Thief performed by Radiohead

Best Engineered Album, Classical
Richard King & Todd Whitelock (engineers) for Obrigado Brazil performed by Yo-Yo Ma

Best Remixed Recording, Non-Classical
Maurice Joshua (remixer) for Crazy In Love (Maurice's Soul Mix) performed by Beyoncé & Jay-Z

Producer of the Year, Non-Classical
The Neptunes

Producer of the Year, Classical
Steven Epstein

R&B
Best Female R&B Vocal Performance
Beyoncé for "Dangerously In Love 2"
Best Male R&B Vocal Performance
Luther Vandross for "Dance with My Father"
Best R&B Performance by a Duo or Group with Vocals
Luther Vandross & Beyoncé for "The Closer I Get to You"
Best Traditional R&B Vocal Performance
"Wonderful" – Aretha Franklin
Best Urban/Alternative Performance
"Hey Ya!" – OutKast
Best R&B Song
Shawn Carter, Rich Harrison, Beyoncé Knowles & Eugene Record for "Crazy in Love" performed by Beyoncé featuring Jay-Z
Best R&B Album
Ray Bardani (engineer/mixer) & Luther Vandross (producer & artist) for Dance with My Father
Best Contemporary R&B Album
Tony Maserati (engineer/mixer) & Beyoncé (producer & artist) for Dangerously in Love

Rap
 Best Female Rap Solo Performance
"Work It" – Missy Elliott
"Got It Poppin" – Da Brat
"Came Back For You" – Lil' Kim
"Ride Wit' Me" – MC Lyte
"Go Head" – Queen Latifah
Best Male Rap Solo Performance
"Lose Yourself" – Eminem
"Pump It Up" – Joe Budden
"In Da Club" – 50 Cent
 "Stand Up" – Ludacris 
"Get Busy" – Sean Paul

Best Rap Performance by a Duo or Group
"Shake Ya Tailfeather" – Nelly, P. Diddy & Murphy Lee
"Gossip Folks" – Missy Elliott featuring Ludacris
"Magic Stick" – Lil' Kim featuring 50 Cent
"Dipset (Santana's Town)" – Juelz Santana featuring Cam'ron
"Can't Stop, Won't Stop" – Young Gunz 

Best Rap/Sung Collaboration
"Crazy in Love" – Beyoncé featuring Jay-Z
"Where Is The Love?" – The Black Eyed Peas with Justin Timberlake
"Luv U Better" – LL Cool J featuring Marc Dorsey
"Frontin' – The Neptunes featuring Pharrell Williams & Jay-Z
"Beautiful" – Snoop Dogg featuring Pharrell & Uncle Charlie Wilson
Best Rap Song
 "Lose Yourself"
J. Bass, M. Mathers & L. Resto, songwriters (Eminem)
"Beautiful"
Calvin Broadus, Chad Hugo & Pharrell Williams, songwriters (Snoop Dogg featuring Pharrell & Uncle Charlie Wilson)
 "Excuse Me Miss"
 Shawn Carter, Chad Hugo & Pharrell Williams, songwriters (Jay-Z featuring Pharrell Williams)
"In Da Club"
M. Elizondo, C. Jackson & A. Young, songwriters (50 Cent)
"Work It"
Missy Elliott & Tim Mosley, songwriters (Missy Elliott)

Best Rap Album
Speakerboxxx/The Love Below – OutKast
Under Construction – Missy Elliott
Get Rich Or Die Tryin' – 50 Cent
The Blueprint²: The Gift & The Curse – Jay-Z
Phrenology – The Roots

Reggae
Best Reggae Album
Dutty Rock – Sean Paul
Friends For Life – Buju Banon
Free Man – Burning Spear
Ain't Givin' Up – Third World
No Holding Back – Wayne Wonder

Rock
Best Female Rock Vocal Performance
"Trouble" – P!nk
"Are You Happy Now?" – Michelle Branch
"Losing Grip" – Avril Lavigne
"Time of Our Lives" – Bonnie Raitt
"Righteously" – Lucinda Williams
Best Male Rock Vocal Performance
"Gravedigger" – Dave Matthews
"New Killer Star" – David Bowie
"Down in the Flood" – Bob Dylan
"If I Could Fall in Love" – Lenny Kravitz
"Return of Jackie and Judy" – Tom Waits
Best Rock Performance by a Duo or Group with Vocal
"Disorder in the House" – Bruce Springsteen & Warren Zevon
"Times Like These" – Foo Fighters
"There There" – Radiohead
"Seven Nation Army" – The White Stripes
"Calling All Angels" – Train
Best Rock Instrumental Performance
Plan B – Jeff Beck
Best Hard Rock Performance
"Bring Me to Life" – Evanescence
Best Metal Performance
"St. Anger" – Metallica
"Did My Time" – Korn
"Mobscene" – Marilyn Manson
"Smothered" – Spineshank
"Inhale" – Stone Sour
Best Rock Song
Jack White (songwriter) for "Seven Nation Army" performed by The White Stripes
Best Rock Album
Jim Scott (engineer/mixer), David Grohl, Taylor Hawkins, Nate Mendel, Chris Shiflett, Nick Raskulinecz (producers) & Foo Fighters for One by One

Spoken
Best Spoken Word Album
Paul Ruben (producer) & Al Franken for Lies and the Lying Liars Who Tell Them: A Fair and Balanced Look at the Right

Traditional pop
Best Traditional Pop Vocal Album
A Wonderful World – Tony Bennett & k.d lang
Dae Bennett (engineer/mixer), T Bone Burnett (producer),

World
Best Traditional World Music Album
Jon Mark (engineer & producer) & the monks of Sherab Ling Monastery for Sacred Tibetan Chant
Best Contemporary World Music Album
Stéphane Caisson (engineer), José da Silva (producer) & Cesária Évora for Voz d'Amor
Asha Bhosle was nominated for You've Stolen My Heart, thus becoming the first ever Indian artist to earn a Grammy nomination.

In memoriam 
Bobby Hatfield

Michael Kamen

Little Eva

Hank Ballard

Edwin Starr

Nina Simone

Barry White

Tony Thompson (drummer)

Herbie Mann

Benny Carter

Luther Henderson

Billy May

John Guerin

Buddy Arnold

Bebu Silvetti

Babatunde Olatunji

Bob Keane

Johnny Cash

June Carter Cash

Don Gibson

Johnny Paycheck

Sam Phillips

Felice and Boudleaux Bryant

Max D. Barnes

Sheb Wooley

Eugene Istomin

Rosalyn Tureck

Luciano Berio

Lou Harrison

Celia Cruz

Rubén González (pianist)

Compay Segundo

Mickie Most

Elliott Smith

Noel Redding

Robert Palmer (singer)

Warren Zevon

Special merit awards

Grammy Hall of Fame Award
"All I Have to Do Is Dream" (Cadence, 1958) performed by The Everly Brothers
"Aquarius/Let The Sunshine In (The Flesh Failures)" (Soul City, 1969) performed by The 5th Dimension
"Bohemian Rhapsody" (Elektra, 1976) performed by Queen
"By the Time I Get to Phoenix" (Capitol, 1967) performed by Glen Campbell
Chopin: The Complete Nocturnes (RCA Red Seal, 1965) performed by Arthur Rubinstein
Come Fly With Me (Capitol, 1958) performed by Frank Sinatra
Court and Spark (Asylum, 1974) performed by Joni Mitchell
Ellington at Newport (Columbia, 1957) performed by Duke Ellington & His Orchestra
"Everyday I Have the Blues" (RPM, 1955) performed by B.B. King
Funny Girl (Capitol, 1964) performed by the original Broadway cast with Barbra Streisand & Sydney Chaplin
Golden Jubilee Concert: Rachmaninoff Concerto no. 3 (RCA Red Seal, 1978) performed by Vladimir Horowitz with Eugene Ormandy conducting the New York Philharmonic Orchestra
"He's a Rebel" (Philles, 1962) performed by The Crystals
"Holiday for Strings" (RCA Victor, 1943) David Rose & His Orchestra
"I've Got the World on a String" (Capitol, 1953) performed by Frank Sinatra
Johnny Cash at San Quentin (Columbia, 1969) performed by Johnny Cash
"Just the Way You Are" (Columbia, 1978) performed by Billy Joel
"Last Date" (RCA, 1960) performed by Floyd Cramer
Led Zeppelin (Atlantic, 1969) performed by Led Zeppelin
"Let It Be" (Apple, 1970) performed by The Beatles
Let's Get It On (Tamla, 1973) performed by Marvin Gaye
"Love Is Strange" (Groove/ RCA, 1957) performed by Mickey & Sylvia
Milestones (Columbia, 1958) performed by the Miles Davis Sextet
"Night and Day" (RCA Victor, 1932) performed by Leo Reisman & His Orchestra with Fred Astaire
"A Night In Tunisia" (Victor, 1946) performed by Dizzy Gillespie & His Sextet
"Pennies From Heaven" (Decca, 1936) performed by Bing Crosby
"Rock-A-Bye Your Baby With a Dixie Melody" (Columbia, 1918) performed by Al Jolson
Saturday Night Fever (RSO, 1977) performed by the motion picture cast
"See See Rider Blues" (Paramount, 1925) performed by Ma Rainey
"The Sound of Silence" (Columbia, 1965) performed by Simon & Garfunkel
That's the Way of the World (Columbia, 1975) performed by Earth, Wind & Fire
Walt Disney's Fantasia (Buena Vista, 1956) performed by the Philadelphia Orchestra conducted by Leopold Stokowski
West Side Story (Columbia, 1961) performed by the motion picture cast
"You're So Vain" (Elektra, 1973) performed by Carly Simon

MusiCares Person of the Year
Sting

Technical Grammy Award
Douglas Sax 
Solid State Logic

Grammy Trustees Award
Gerry Goffin and Carole King
Orrin Keepnews
Marian McPartland

Lifetime Achievement Award
Van Cliburn
The Funk Brothers
Ella Jenkins
Sonny Rollins
Artie Shaw
Doc Watson

Trivia
OutKast's Speakerboxxx/The Love Below became the first and only rap album to date to win Album of the Year. It was also the second hip-hop album to win Album of the Year, following Lauryn Hill's R&B album, The Miseducation of Lauryn Hill (1998).
Beyoncé became the fourth female artist to win a record five awards in one night. Prior to Beyoncé, Norah Jones, Alicia Keys and Lauryn Hill had won five in one night. Since 2004 Amy Winehouse and Alison Krauss became the fifth and sixth artists respectively to tie this record. Beyoncé is the only one of these six artists who never win a general field award out of her five wins. In 2010, Beyoncé broke this record, earning six awards. This record was later tied by a British singer Adele in 2012.
Justin Timberlake apologized for the Super Bowl halftime show the past week in his acceptance speech that night. However, Janet Jackson does not appear at the event.
As Evanescence were presented with the award for Best New Artist, rapper 50 Cent went up to the stage. 50 Cent was nominated for Best New Artist, losing to Evanescence.
Luther Vandross won four awards however he was unable to attend due to a stroke he suffered several months earlier. Celine Dion sang his song "Dance With My Father" with Richard Marx playing piano in tribute to Luther Vandross. The song was finally awarded the award for Song of the Year later that night. During the show they showed a videotaped clip that was pre-taped of him saying "Whenever I say goodbye it's never for long because I believe in the power of love". Vandross died the following year in 2005.
Warren Zevon who died in September 2003 was awarded two posthumous awards; Best Contemporary Folk Album for The Wind and Best Rock Performance by a Duo or Group with Vocal for his duet with Bruce Springsteen, Disorder in the House.
The show also featured a tribute to The Beatles in honor of the 40th anniversary of their arrival in America and their appearance on The Ed Sullivan Show. During the show, both widows of deceased members – Yoko Ono and Olivia Harrison – made an on-stage appearance.

References

External links 
New York Times, February 4, 2004, The Grammy Award Winners of 2004

 046
2004 in American music
2004 in California
2004 music awards
2004 in Los Angeles
Grammy
February 2004 events in the United States